Elis (in the local dialect: Ϝᾶλις, Modern ) was the capital city of the ancient polis (city-state) of Elis, in ancient Greece. It was situated in the northwest of the Peloponnese, to the west of Arcadia. This hill was the acropolis of Elis, and commanded as well the narrow valley of the Peneius as the open plain beyond. The ancient city lay at the foot of the hill, and extended across the river, as Strabo says that the Peneius flowed through the city; but since no remains are now found on the right or northern bank, it is probable that all the public buildings were on the left bank of the river, more especially as Pausanias does not make any allusion to the river in his description of the city.

Elis is mentioned as a town of the Epeii by Homer in the Catalogue of Ships in the Iliad; but in the earliest times the two chief towns in the country appear to have been Ephyra the residence of Augeias, in the interior, and Buprasium on the coast. Some writers suppose that Ephyra was the more ancient name of Elis, but it appears to have been a different place, situated upon the Ladon. Elis first became a place of importance upon the invasion of Peloponnesus by the Dorians. Oxylus and his Aetolian followers appear to have settled on the height which later formed Elis's acropolis as the spot best adapted for ruling the country. From this time it was the residence of the kings, and of the aristocratic families who governed the country after the abolition of royalty. Elis was the only fortified town in the country; the rest of the inhabitants dwelt in unwalled villages, paying obedience to the ruling class at Elis.

Soon after the Greco-Persian Wars the exclusive privileges of the aristocratic families in Elis were abolished, and a democratic government established. Along with this revolution a great change took place in the city of Elis. The city appears to have been originally confined to the acropolis; but the inhabitants of many separate townships, eight according to Strabo, now removed to the capital, and built round the acropolis a new city, which they left undefended by walls, relying upon the sanctity of their country. At the same time the Eleians were divided into a certain number of local tribes; or if the latter existed before, they now acquired for the first time political rights. The Hellanodicae, or presidents of the Ancient Olympic Games, who had formerly been taken from the aristocratic families, were now appointed, by lot, one from each of the local tribes; and the fluctuating number of the Hellanodicae shows the increase and decrease from time to time of the Eleian territory. It is probable that each of the three districts into which Elis was divided, Hollow Elis, Pisatis, and Triphylia, contained four tribes. This is in accordance with the fourfold ancient division of Hollow Elis, and with the twice four townships in the Pisatis. Pausanias in his account of the number of the Hellanodicae says that there were 12 Hellanodicae in 103rd Olympiad, which was immediately after the Battle of Leuctra, when the Eleians recovered for a short time their ancient dominions, but that being shortly afterwards deprived of Triphylia by the Arcadians, the number of their tribes was reduced to eight.

When Pausanias visited Elis, it was one of the most populous and splendid cities of Greece. With such scanty remains it would be impossible to attempt any reconstruction of the city, and to assign to particular sites the buildings mentioned by Pausanias.

Strabo says that the gymnasium stood on the side of the river Peneius; and it is probable that the gymnasium and agora occupied the greater part of the space between the river and the citadel. The gymnasium was a vast enclosure surrounded by a wall. It was by far the largest gymnasium in Greece, which is accounted for by the fact that all the athletes in the Ancient Olympic Games were obliged to undergo a month's previous training in the gymnasium at Elis. The enclosure bore the general name of Xystus, and within it there were special places destined for the runners, and separated from one another by plane-trees. The gymnasium contained three subdivisions, called respectively Plethrium, Tetragonum, and Malco: the first so called from its dimensions, the second from its shape, and the third from the softness of the soil. In their Malco was the senate-house of the Eleians, called Lalichium from the name of its founders: it was also used for literary exhibitions.

The gymnasium had two principal entrances, one leading by the street called Siope or Silence to the baths, and the other above the cenotaph of Achilles to the agora and the Hellanodicaeum. The agora was also called the hippodrome, because it was used for the exercise of horses. It was built in the ancient style, and, instead of being surrounded by an uninterrupted, series of stoae or colonnades, its stoae were separated, from one another by streets. The southern stoa, which consisted of a triple row of Doric columns, was the usual resort of the Hellanodicae during the day. Towards one end of this stoa to the left was the Hellanodicaeum, a building divided from the agora by a street, which was the official residence of the Hellanodicae, who received here instruction in their duties for ten months preceding the festival. There was another stoa in the agora called the Corcyraean stoa, because it had been built out of the tenth of some spoils taken from the Corcyraeans. It consisted of two rows of Doric columns, with a partition wall running between them: one side was open to the agora, and the other to a temple of Aphrodite Urania, in which was a statue of the goddess in gold and ivory by Pheidias. In the open part of the agora, Pausanias mentions the temple of Apollo Acacesius, which was the principal temple in Elis, statues of Helios and Selene (Sun and Moon), a temple of the Graces, a temple of Silenus, and the tomb of Oxylus. On the way to the theatre was the temple of Hades, which was opened only once in the year.

The theatre must have been on the slope of the acropolis: it is described by Pausanias as lying between the agora and the Menius, which, if the name is not corrupt, must be the brook flowing down from the heights behind the old town. Near the theatre was a temple of Dionysus, containing a statue of this god by Praxiteles.

On the acropolis was a temple of Athena, containing a statue of the goddess in gold and ivory by Pheidias. On the summit of the acropolis are the remains of a castle, in the walls of which Ernst Curtius noticed, when he visited in the 19th century, some fragments of Doric columns which probably belonged to the temple of Athena.

In the immediate neighbourhood of Elis was Petra, where the tomb of the philosopher Pyrrho was shown.

The acropolis of Elis is now called Kalokaspoi in Greek and the Venetians, who occupied the area in the Middle Ages, transformed this name into Belvedere.

References

Ancient Greek cities
Cities in ancient Peloponnese
Populated places in ancient Elis
Former populated places in Greece
Locations in the Iliad